Onchopristis is an extinct genus of sclerorhynchoid from the Cretaceous of North Africa, Europe, and North America. Its name is derived from the Ancient Greek ónkos (ὄγκος, 'barb') and prístis (πρίστις, 'saw' or 'sawfish'). It contains two valid species, O. numida and O. dunklei. Onchopristis first appeared in the Barremian and its latest occurrence dates to the Campanian, making it one of the oldest and longest-lived sclerorhynchoid genera.

Description
Like other sclerorhynchoids, it had a long rostrum with large denticles similar to sawfishes and sawsharks. This feature was convergently evolved and its closest living relatives are actually skates. Isolated rostral denticles are the most common fossils of Onchopristis, but rostra, chondrocrania, jaws, oral teeth, vertebrae, and dermal denticles have also been found.

Taxonomy

Gigantichthys numidus was named by Émile Haug in 1905 for fragmentary rostral denticles from the Continental intercalaire of Algeria. Haug also named Platyspondylus foureaui for vertebrae from the same formation. Articulated specimens have confirmed that the rostral denticles and vertebrae belong to the same species. In 1917, Ernst Stromer named the new genus Onchopristis with "G". numidus as the type species. Although the spelling "Onchopristis numidus" is commonly used, it is grammatically incorrect and has been emended to O. numida. 

Oral teeth from the Bahariya Formation of Egypt were named Squatina aegyptiaca by Stromer in 1927, and were later renamed as the separate genus Sechmetia by Christa Werner in 1989. Again, articulated specimens confirmed that these teeth belong to O. numida. In 1935, Wilhelm Weiler named Peyeria libyca for what he thought were sawfish rostral denticles from the Bahariya Formation. An associated specimen of Ischyrhiza mira, a close relative of Onchopristis, indicates that "Peyeria" are actually dermal denticles from O. numida. 

A second valid species from the Woodbine Formation of Texas, Onchopristis dunklei, was named by Charles McNulty, Jr. and Bob Slaughter in 1962. In 1971, John Thurmond named the subspecies O. dunklei praecursor, but it is probably not distinct from O. dunklei. Rostral denticles from New Zealand formerly referred to "O. d. praecursor" have been reassigned to their own genus and species, Australopristis wiffeni.

References

Prehistoric cartilaginous fish genera
Cretaceous cartilaginous fish
Prehistoric fish of Africa
Sclerorhynchoidei